Aloysius Jin Luxian (June 20, 1916 – April 27, 2013) was a Roman Catholic bishop of the Roman Catholic Diocese of Shanghai.

Biography 
Bishop Aloysius Jin was born in Shanghai into a family that had been Catholic for generations.  He was orphaned as a youth, losing his mother when he was 10 and his father when he was 14.  He attended Catholic schools and in 1938, at the age of 22, he entered the Society of Jesus, subsequently being ordained in 1946.  He studied in France, Germany and Italy, before returning to China in 1951.

He was arrested with hundreds of priests and laity in the “September 8 Incident” in 1955, a major crackdown against the “counterrevolutionary clique” of Ignatius Kung Pin-mei of Shanghai.  He was subsequently released from prison in 1982 and became the founding rector of the Sheshan Major Seminary, outside of Shanghai.

Bishop Jin was ordained auxiliary bishop without Vatican approval in 1985, and became diocesan bishop of Shanghai in 1988 to his death in 2013. In 2005, the Holy See eventually recognized him as Apostolic Administrator to bishop Msgr. Joseph Fan Zhongliang.

Bibliography

See also 

 Catholic Patriotic Association
 Ignatius Gong Pinmei
 K. H. Ting

References

Weblinks 

 Aloysius Jin Luxian - Bishop of Shanghai, China-Center: China today 2007, Nr. 4–5, S. 153–155.
 Gianni Valente: Der weite Weg des Aloysius Jin Luxian, 30 Giorni, 5/2007
 , KiZ Nr. 44, 2. November 2003

1916 births
2013 deaths
Roman Catholic bishops in Shanghai
Writers from Shanghai
Chinese expatriates in Germany
Chinese Jesuits
Jesuit bishops
20th-century Jesuits
21st-century Roman Catholic bishops in China
20th-century Roman Catholic bishops in China
Bishops of the Catholic Patriotic Association